West Tyrone may refer to:

The western part of County Tyrone
West Tyrone (Assembly constituency), a constituency in the Northern Ireland Assembly, created in 1996
West Tyrone (Northern Ireland Parliament constituency), a county constituency from 1929–1972
West Tyrone (UK Parliament constituency), a county constituency in Northern Ireland, created in 1997